Feilai Temple is a Buddhist temple located on the bank of Bei River, in Qingyuan, Guangdong, China. Feilai Temple was originally built in 520, but because of natural disasters has been rebuilt numerous times since then. The present version was completed in June 2004.

Legend
A legendary and mysterious saying is that the Yellow Emperor had two sons Taiyu and Zhongyang, both of whom lived in seclusion at the foot of Feilai Gorge, beside the Bei River. One night, under the moonlight, they drinking and composing, and enjoying the beautiful scenery. However, they felt regretful that the scenery are natural landscape and the landscape types are a little simple. At once, they rode the cloud and mist to Yanzuo Temple, in Shuzhou (now Anqing), Anhui. They invided abbot Zhenjun to promote Buddhism. The Chan master nodded. So Taiyu and Zhongyang used their spells to move the temple to Feilai Gorge.

History

Feilai Temple was first built in the 1st year of Period Putong (520) in the Liang dynasty (502–587) by Chan master Zhenjun and Ling'ai. Emperor Wu (464–549) inscribed and honored the name “Zhide Temple”. When Bodhidharma arrived in China, Emperor Wu, a devout Buddhist believer, immediately sent envoys to receive Bodhidharma to the capital Jiankang (now Nanjing) after he heard of his coming, Bodhidharma preached dharma at the temple when he moved north via here.

During the Sui dynasty (581–618), Sengcan, the Third Chinese Patriarch of Chan, once lived in here.

In 677, in the 2nd year of the age of Yifeng (676–679) of Emperor Gaozong, when Huineng (638–713), the Sixth and Last Patriarch of Chan, went from Guangzhou to Caoxi Baolin Temple via Qingyuan, he preached Chan Buddhism in the temple. During the reign of Emperor Ruizong (662–716), its name was changed into "Feilai Chanju Temple", also known as "Guangqing Temple" and "Xiashan Temple".

According to Qingyuan County Annals, the Feilai Temple includes the following halls: the Guangqing Temple, the Feilai Temple, the Dizi Ancestral Hall, the Sixth Patriarch Hall, and the Guanyin Hall.

On November 18, 1978, it was designated as a county level key cultural unit. In 1987, it was listed as a provincial level key cultural heritage.

On May 8, 1997, Feilai Temple was destroyed with eleven mooks and nuns and two workers missing in floods and mudslides after torrential rains hit the South China.

Groundbreaking began on December 28, 1997, and finished on June 16, 2004.

Architecture
 Mahavira Hall
 Drum tower
 Bell tower
 Mahaparinirvana Hall
 Abbot's Quarters
 Hall of Kshitigarbha
 Buddhist Texts Library

References

Further reading

Buddhist temples in Guangdong
Buildings and structures in Qingyuan
Tourist attractions in Qingyuan
6th-century establishments in China
6th-century Buddhist temples